John Pearson (31 March 1926 – 2 November 1994) was a British sports shooter. He competed in the 300 m rifle, three positions event at the 1952 Summer Olympics.

References

1926 births
1994 deaths
British male sport shooters
Olympic shooters of Great Britain
Shooters at the 1952 Summer Olympics
Sportspeople from Preston, Lancashire
20th-century British people